Nematoctonus (the name of which means 'nematode murderer') was a genus of fungi in the Pleurotaceae family, which is now considered a synonym of Hohenbuehelia. Originally the generic name —an anamorphic form of Hohenbuehelia—has a widespread distribution and contains 16 species.  Under the one fungus - one name convention, the correct name for the group is Hohenbuehelia and species where the fruitbodies have not been discovered or that are older names for those described as fruitbodies have all been transferred to Hohenbuehelia.

Species
Nematoctonus angustatus
Nematoctonus brevisporus
Nematoctonus campylosporus
Nematoctonus concurrens
Nematoctonus cylindrosporus
Nematoctonus geogenius
Nematoctonus hamatus
Nematoctonus haptocladus
Nematoctonus leiosporus
Nematoctonus leptosporus
Nematoctonus lignicola, nom. inval., Art. 37.1
Nematoctonus pachysporus
Nematoctonus robustus
Nematoctonus subreniformis
Nematoctonus tripolitanius
Nematoctonus tylosporus

References

External links

Pleurotaceae
Obsolete fungus taxa